Coleochaete is a genus of parenchymatous charophyte green algae in the order Coleochaetales. They are haploid, reproduce both sexually and asexually, and have true multicellular organisation, with plasmodesmata communicating between adjacent cells. The plants form flat, sprawling discs on solid surfaces in freshwater streams worldwide, usually as epiphytes on aquatic plants or growing on the surface of stones. They are seen as one of two most probable sister groups to land plant species, the second candidate group being the Characeae. The issue is still not resolved. As they show some of the earliest and simplest features of multicellular plant growth, they are ideal model organisms in the field of synthetic biology. They are easy to culture and techniques that have been used to study Arabidopsis thaliana are now being applied to Coleochaete.

Coleochaete has a sterile jacket of cells that surround the gametangia and zygotes that are protected by a layer of sterile cells after fertilization.  However, unlike land plants, Coleochaete has zygotic meiosis, meiosis taking place directly in the zygote and not in diploid cells resulting from mitotic division of the zygote.

Species
 Coleochaete divergens
 Coleochaete irregularis 
 Coleochaete nitellarum 
 Coleochaete orbicularis 
 Coleochaete pulvinata 
 Coleochaete sampsonii 
 Coleochaete scutata 
 Coleochaete soluta

References

External links
 

Charophyta
Charophyta genera